Krasnoznamensky (masculine), Krasnoznamenskaya (feminine), or Krasnoznamenskoye (neuter) may refer to:
Krasnoznamensky District, a district of Kaliningrad Oblast, Russia
Krasnoznamensky Urban Okrug, a municipal formation into which Krasnoznamensky District in Kaliningrad Oblast, Russia is incorporated
Krasnoznamenskoye Urban Settlement, a former municipal formation into which the town of district significance of Krasnoznamensk in Krasnoznamensky District of Kaliningrad Oblast, Russia was incorporated
Krasnoznamensky (rural locality) (Krasnoznamenskaya, Krasnoznamenskoye), several rural localities in Russia